Javier del Pino González (born 10 July 1980) is a Spanish former footballer who played as a forward.

He spent the better part of his 18-year professional career with Numancia (11 seasons), appearing in 298 competitive matches and scoring 49 goals.

Club career
Del Pino was born in Madrid. An Atlético Madrid academy graduate, he managed to appear once for the first team whilst they were in the Segunda División, playing five minutes in a 4–2 home win against Real Murcia on 6 April 2002.

After three seasons with Xerez CD (also in the second tier), del Pino moved to CD Numancia, where he was an important element in helping the club return to the top flight in 2008 after a three-year absence. He made his La Liga debut on 31 August of that year at the age of 28 years and one month, coming on as a substitute against FC Barcelona in a 1–0 home win. The team were eventually relegated after ranking second-bottom, and he scored a career-best nine goals the following campaign – best in the squad – but the Sorians failed to regain their lost status.

On 1 June 2016, del Pino announced he would retire at the end of the season. His last appearance occurred three days later at the age of 35, a 2–0 home victory over already relegated Albacete Balompié.

References

External links

1980 births
Living people
Spanish footballers
Footballers from Madrid
Association football forwards
La Liga players
Segunda División players
Segunda División B players
Tercera División players
Atlético Madrid C players
Atlético Madrid B players
CF Rayo Majadahonda players
Atlético Madrid footballers
Xerez CD footballers
CD Numancia players